COQ3, also known as ubiquinone biosynthesis O-methyltransferase, mitochondrial is an enzyme that in humans is encoded by the COQ3 gene.

See also
 Hexaprenyldihydroxybenzoate methyltransferase, an enzyme
 3-demethylubiquinone-9 3-O-methyltransferase, an enzyme

References